Imran Amed  is a Canadian-British fashion businessman, and founder and editor-in-chief of The Business of Fashion.

Background
Amed was born and raised in Calgary, Alberta, and is of Indian descent. Amed attended McGill University in Montreal, Quebec.  After graduation, he worked as a management consultant. In 2000, he enrolled at Harvard Business School to complete an MBA. Upon graduation in 2002, he moved to London to work for McKinsey & Company, the global management consulting firm. He left McKinsey in 2006 to explore his interest in the fashion industry.

Editorial work
Until 2013, Amed has become a main contributor to "The Business of Fashion" (BoF). BoF employs nearly 80 people in offices in London, New York, and Shanghai.

Awards and honors
In 2016, at the Council of Fashion Designers of America Awards, Amed was awarded the Media Award in Honor of Eugenia Sheppard.

He was appointed Member of the Order of the British Empire (MBE) in the 2017 New Year Honors for services to fashion.

Products
In 2011, Amed launched a bag design collaboration with British leather goods designer Bill Amberg.

Books
 Pattern, Phaidon, 2013

References

External links
The Business of Fashion

Canadian fashion journalists
McGill University alumni
Businesspeople from Calgary
Journalists from Alberta
Canadian emigrants to the United Kingdom
Living people
Harvard Business School alumni
McKinsey & Company people
Canadian people of Indian descent
English people of Indian descent
Members of the Order of the British Empire
Year of birth missing (living people)